is a Japanese anime television series by Xebec. The series began airing on July 3, 2014. The series was picked up by Crunchyroll for simulcast streaming with English subtitles. The anime has been licensed by Sentai Filmworks.

Plot
The story takes place in a world where two countries, Arandas and Ingelmia, have been warring against each other for a very long time. Tokimune Sumusu, a young man belonging to Independent Unit 8 of Arandas, saves a girl named Jamie when she is attacked by enemy forces. In order to survive, he pilots the new mech Argevollen and fights. The new mech Argevollen is defined by its U-Link system wherein the Argevollen molds to its pilot's mind and cannot be piloted by anyone else. This customization allows the pilot to use it by envisioning in his mind what he wants it to do, rather than physically moving and steering it.

Aircraft cannot be used due to large-scale environmental and geological changes caused by the explosion of strategic weapons (SMMs) used in past wars. The war was still ongoing, centuries after the disaster, which occurred in A.O. (World Calendar) 2015. In addition to existing land weapons, the warring nations use humanoid mobile weapons called "Trail Kriegers". One of these, piloted by Tokimune Susumu, belongs to the independent eighth unit of the "Kingdom of Arandas alliance". Both Alandas and Ingelmia have long histories and corruption in their military. As the war between Arandas and the neighboring "Ingelmia Union" continues, the Great Wall, the fortress of Arandas that has long prevented the invasion of enemy nations, is finally on the verge of falling.

Characters

Kingdom of Arandas alliance

A young and reckless soldier who becomes the sole pilot of the new Trail Krieger prototype Argevollen. He joined the army and became a Trail Krieger pilot in order to rise through the ranks quickly and find information about the truth behind his sister's death during her time in the military. After finding out the truth about the Argevollen, he decides to continue pilot it, as it is a way of connecting to his sister, despite going berserk when the U-link connection is too deep.

A junior engineer and sole survivor of the Kivernas convoy that was transporting the Argevollen. She maintains the unit for Tokimune and is the only one who knows how to start its operating system, and therefore forced to remain with Independent Unit 8 despite her worries about Tokimune getting herself and her robot into deadly situations. She accidentally overheard the truth about the incident of Reika Nanjou and gets worried each time Tokimune enters a berserk state while piloting, but nonetheless supports his decision and helps him in any way she can.

The Commander of the Independent Unit 8. He is a very serious and stoic person who cares a lot about the safety of his squad. He once knew Tokimune's older sister and blames himself for the experiment that took her life. While he clearly dislikes General Cayenne, he agrees on becoming the controlling pilot of the Perphevollen's unmanned units, not wanting the Independent Unit 8 get involved. Despite his attempts, he's not allowed to die, but he ends up destroying the U-Link system, and later he's sent as a representative to the Ingelmian military.

The second in-command of the Independent Unit 8. Unlike Samonji, she's kind and friendly, but she also cares a lot about the squad.

An experienced mech pilot from the Independent Unit 8, and an expert at holding her liquor.

Another mech pilot from the Independent Unit 8 who tends to flirt with the girls in the squad.

The head mechanic of the Independent Unit 8.

One of the mechanics of the Independent Unit 8 that befriends Jamie.

Another mechanic of the Independent Unit 8 that befriends Jamie.

One of the mechanics of the Independent Unit 8 that befriends Jamie.

Communication Systems operator of the Independent Unit 8.

The scout of the Independent Unit 8.

A soldier of the Independent Unit 8.

A soldier of the Independent Unit 8.

Sergeant of the Independent Unit 8.

A soldier of the Independent Unit 8 from the quiet town of Wishpe. His parents died when he was young and he joined Arandas army to get out of Wishpe, but still visits from time to time.

A soldier of the Independent Unit 8.

A Colonel of the Arandas army and an old friend of Samonji.

A girl who is assigned to the Independent Unit 8, as well as bringing the new models ZTK5 Seiran, that used her data during production. She met Tokimune during their time at the military academy.

A Brigadier general of the Arandas army who is closely involved with the Kybernes company and their higher-ups. He convinces Samonji to join his cause of continue the war using the unmanned Trail Krieger's Perphevollen new units (who were based on the Argevollen's data) and even organizes a rebellion against the military who wanted peace. He's killed by Suzushiro when he tries to execute Samonji for disobeying his orders.

A former soldier who retired after Reika Najou's death and an old friend of Samonji and Suzushiro. He investigates Cayenne and Kybernes for Samonji.

Tokimune's older sister, who died several years before the story began. She joined the experiment of Argent Point in order to help create an army where no one died. The control of several units put a great strain on her body, until the units went out of control and she was driven to kill herself, dying while Samonji was trying to get her out of her Trail Krieger. Her data was used in the creation of the Argevollen.

The Countries Unification of Ingelmia

An ace Trail Krieger pilot of the Ingelmian army who consistently refused promotion multiple times to remain on the front lines. A recurring rival of the Argevollen whose own experience in battle can match the better-equipped prototype. After some time he obtains his own improved version of Trail Krieger, whose speed even surpasses the Argevollen, named Strum Alpha. He now wants a rematch against the Argevollen. He dies once Samonji chooses to destroy the U-Link System. His name referres to Manfred von Richthofen, the Red Baron

The leader of Ingelmia

A Colonel of the Ingelmian Army, who dislikes the Intelligence branch of the army and only pretends to be under their control. He's later recruited by Rontaul into leading the final invasion to Arandas, supervising the new units Sturm Beta.

A second lieutenant and a former subordinate of Conrad Daniels, who is later assigned to help Richtofen when he obtains the Sturm Alpha. She simply chooses to watch as Richthofen becomes consumed by the Sturm Alpha.

A Major of the Ingelmian Army and a close subordinate of Arnold Holmes.

A General of the Ingelmian army, who is an acquaintance of Julius Junios. Coming from an old military family, his arrogance and the belief that he was in charge led to his downfall. He was murdered by his old apprentice Rontaul, while already celebrating his victory.

A member of the Intelligence branch of the Ingelmian army, who murdered his old teacher Zarl after they had no more use for him. He later recruits Holmes to his cause and also presents him with the new units, named Sturm Beta. He is killed by Gaap when he tries to kill Holmes for refusing to retreat.

Episode list
The series' first opening theme is "Tough Intention" by Kotoko and the first ending theme is "Faith" by Sachika Misawa.

The second opening theme is "ZoNE-iT" by Kotoko and the second ending theme is "Vivid Telepathy" by Nami Tamaki.

References

External links
 

Anime with original screenplays
Tokyo MX original programming
Mecha anime and manga
Sentai Filmworks
Xebec (studio)